Ngarralja Tommy May is an Indigenous Australian artist. He won the 2020 NATSIAA Telstra Award for his tin-etching art, 'Wirrkanja'.

He is a Wangkajungka/Walmajarri man born in Yarrnkurnja in the Great Sandy Desert, in 1935. His work is in the collection of the Art Gallery of Western Australia.

Work 
In 1997, May collaborated with over 40 other artists over a period of 12 days to produce Ngurrara Canvas II, a painting with an area of 80 square metres depicting the Great Sandy Desert. In 2019, May and four other artists worked with Lisa Gorman on limited edition clothing.

References

Year of birth missing (living people)
Living people
Australian Aboriginal artists
Australian contemporary artists
People from Western Australia